Walkelin de Ferrers may refer to:

Walchelin de Ferriers, 12th century lord of Oakham Castle
Walkelin de Derby, 12th century lord of Egginton, Derbyshire
Walkeline de Ferrers (d.c. 1040), 11th century Seigneur of Ferrières-Saint-Hilaire and father of Henry de Ferrers